Raymond A. "Ray" Kingsmith (c. 1928 – May 3, 1988) was a politician and curler from Alberta, Canada.

Politics
Kingsmith ran for a seat in the Legislative Assembly of Alberta in the 1971 Alberta general election for the Social Credit Party. He decided to take on incumbent Bill Dickie in Calgary-Glenmore who had crossed the floor two years earlier from the Liberals to the Progressive Conservatives. Dickie won re-election easily, Kingsmith finished second out of the three fielded candidates taking 35% of the vote.

Curling
Kingsmith was inducted in 1983 to the Alberta Sports Hall of Fame under the curling category. He was inducted into the Canadian Curling Hall of Fame in 1986 and 1994 under the builder category. He was president of the Canadian Curling Association from 1983 to 1984. He died of cancer at a hospital in Calgary in 1988. Kingsmith was posthumously awarded the World Curling Freytag Award in 2011, and was inducted into the WCF Hall of Fame the next year.

The Kingsmith Memorial Golf Tournament is named in his honour and held annually to raise money for a scholarship in his name.

References

External links
Ray Kingsmith Award
Raymond A. "Ray" Kingsmith at the Canadian Curling Hall of Fame

Canadian sportsperson-politicians
Curlers from Alberta
Alberta Social Credit Party candidates in Alberta provincial elections
Year of birth unknown
1988 deaths
Year of birth uncertain
Canadian male curlers
Alberta Sports Hall of Fame inductees
Curling Canada presidents